Vingtaine de la Rue is one of the four vingtaines of Grouville Parish on the Channel Island of Jersey.

References

la Rue
Grouville